Mohd Na'im bin Mokhtar (Jawi: محمد نعيم بن مختار; born 25 November 1967) is a Malaysian politician, lawyer and legal scholar who has served as Minister in the Prime Minister's Department in charge of Religious Affairs in the Pakatan Harapan (PH) administration under Prime Minister Anwar Ibrahim as well as Senator since December 2022. He served as 4th Chief Judge of the Syariah Court from April 2019 to his appointment as a minister in December 2022. He is presently the sole independent minister.

Career 
Na’im was educated at the International Islamic University Malaysia, where he obtained a Bachelor of Laws (LLB) degree. He subsequently earned a Masters in Laws (LLM) degree from the University of London and a Diploma in Syariah Law and Practice from the International Islamic University Malaysia. He also holds a Doctor of Philosophy (PhD) in Syariah from the National University of Malaysia.

Na’im began his career as a law lecturer at the International Islamic University Malaysia. He later worked as a Syariah lawyer in Negeri Sembilan, Malacca, and the Federal Territories, and as an advocate and solicitor in Malaya. In 1998, he was appointed as a Judge for the Syariah Court of Petaling, where he served until 2001. He was subsequently appointed as a Judge for the Syariah Court of the Federal Territory of Kuala Lumpur, where he served until 2003. In 2003, he was appointed as a research officer by the Syariah Judiciary Department Malaysia, where he worked until 2005. He has also served as a visiting lecturer at the National University of Malaysia and the International Islamic University Malaysia.

In addition to his judicial duties, Na’im has been a visiting fellow at the Oxford Centre for Islamic Studies at Oxford University and at Harvard Law School. He has also been appointed as an external examiner for PhD candidates at the International Islamic University Malaysia, the MARA University of Technology, and the National University of Malaysia. He sits on the Malaysian Qualifying Agency panel and committee and is an adjunct professor at the Law Faculty of the University Technology Mara.

Na’im has participated in many local and international seminars on family law, Syariah law, and related topics. He has also presented papers on these subjects at conferences in Malaysia and abroad. He sits on the Syariah advisory boards of several local and foreign Islamic banks and takaful companies.

In December 2022, he was appointed as a Minister in the Prime Minister's Department for Religious Affairs in the Anwar Ibrahim cabinet.

Honours
 :
 Member of the Order of the Defender of the Realm (AMN) (2008)
 :
 Knight Commander of the Order of the Crown of Selangor (DPMS) - Dato’ (2015)
 Knight Grand Companion of the Order of Sultan Sharafuddin Idris Shah (SSIS) - Dato’ Setia (2020)

References

Living people
Place of birth missing (living people)
21st-century Malaysian judges
Members of the Order of the Defender of the Realm
Knights Commander of the Order of the Crown of Selangor
1967 births
Sharia lawyers